The Gualeguaychú Department (in Spanish, Departamento Gualeguaychú) is an administrative subdivision (departamento) of the province of Entre Ríos, Argentina. It is located in the south-east of the province, beside the Uruguay River.

The head town is Gualeguaychú (population 76,000). Other cities and towns are Aldea San Antonio, Larroque, Urdinarrain, Gilbert, Enrique Carbó, Pueblo General Belgrano, Irazusta, Costa Uruguay Norte, Aldea San Juan, Faustino M. Parera, General Almada, Las Mercedes, Cuchilla Redonda, Costa San Antonio, Rincón del Gato, Distrito Talitas, Alarcón, Estación Escriña, Costa Uruguay Sur, Pastor Britos, Perdices, and Rincón del Cinto.

References
 

Departments of Entre Ríos Province